The Citadel was a 1960 British television adaptation of A. J. Cronin's 1937 novel, The Citadel. The series was directed by John Frankau and produced by Peter Graham Scott. It starred Eric Lander as Dr. Andrew Manson, and Zena Walker as Christine, his wife. This television adaptation is entirely missing, i.e. all nine episodes are believed to be lost.

Other television versions include an American television film (1960), another British serial (1983), and two Italian (1964 and 2003) adaptations.

Plot summary

Cast
 Eric Lander as Dr. Andrew Manson 9 episodes, 1960-1961 
 Zena Walker as Christine Barlow 7 episodes, 1960-1961 
 Jack May as Dr. Philip Denny 6 episodes, 1960-1961 
 Noel Harrison as Freddie Foxley 6 episodes, 1960-1961 
 Barry Keegan as Con Boland 6 episodes, 1960-1961 
 Elizabeth Shepherd as Frances Le Roy 5 episodes, 1960-1961 
 Richard Vernon as Dr. Ivory 5 episodes, 1960-1961 
 John Laurie as Sir Robert Abbey 5 episodes, 1960-1961 
 Richard Carpenter as Dr. Philip Hope 5 episodes, 1960-1961 
 Fiona Duncan as Mary Boland 5 episodes, 1960-1961

References

External links 
 
 Article about Cronin and the NHS

1960s British drama television series
British drama television series
1960s British television miniseries
British medical television series
1960 British television series debuts
1961 British television series endings
Period television series
Television shows based on British novels
Television shows based on works by A. J. Cronin
1960s British medical television series
Television shows produced by Associated-Rediffusion